Dhū Nuwās,, real name "Yūsuf Asʾar Yathʾar" (Musnad: 𐩺𐩥𐩪𐩰 𐩱𐩪𐩱𐩧 𐩺𐩻𐩱𐩧, Yws¹f ʾs¹ʾr Yṯʾr), "Yosef Nu'as", or "Yūsuf ibn Sharhabīl", also known as "Masruq" in Syriac, and Dounaas in Medieval Greek, was a Jewish king of Himyar between 517 and 525–527 AD, who came to renown on account of his persecutions of peoples of other religions, notably Christians, living in his kingdom.

History
Ibn Hisham's Prophetic biography (better known in English as the Life of Muhammad), describes the exploits of Yūsuf Dhū Nuwās. Ibn Hisham explains that Yūsuf was a convert Jew who grew out his sidelocks (nuwas), and who became known as "he of sidelocks." The historicity of Dhū Nuwās is affirmed by Philostorgius and by Procopius (in the latter's Persian War). Procopius writes that in 525, the armies of the Christian Kingdom of Axum in Ethiopia invaded Yemen at the request of the Byzantine Emperor, Justin I, to take control of the Jewish kingdom in Ḥimyar, then under the leadership of Yūsuf Dhū Nuwās, who rose to power in 522, probably after he assassinated Dhu Shanatir. Ibn Hisham explains the same sequence of events under the name of "Yūsuf Dhū Nuwās." Following this invasion the supremacy of the Jewish religion in the Kingdom of Ḥimyar, as well as in all of Yemen, came to an abrupt end. Imrū al-Qays, the famous Yemeni poet from the same period, in his poem entitled taqūl lī bint al-kinda lammā ‘azafat, laments the death of two great men of Yemen, one of them being Dhū Nuwās, whom he regards as the last of the Himyarite kings:

One Syriac source appears to suggest that the mother of Dhū Nuwās may have been a Jew hailing from the Mesopotamian city of Nisibis. If so, this would place her origins within the Sassanid imperial sphere, and would illuminate possible political reasons for his later actions against the Christians of Arabia, who were natural allies of the Byzantine Empire. Many modern historians, with the exception of Christopher Haas, have argued that her son's conversion was a matter of tactical opportunism, since Judaism would have provided him with an ideological counterweight to the religion of his adversary, the Kingdom of Aksum, and also allowed him to curry favour with the Sassanid shahanshah.

The Martyrs of Najran
According to Ibn Ishaq, the king of Himyar named Dhu Nuwas had burned the Christians in Najran, and an invading army from Aksum (Habashah) occupied Yemen. Dhu Nuwas decided to kill himself by drowning in the sea. Arab tradition states that Dhū Nuwās committed suicide by riding his horse into the Red Sea. The Himyarite kingdom is said to have been ruled by the Du Yazan dynasty of Jewish converts as early as the late fourth century.

According to a number of medieval historians, who depend on the account of John of Ephesus, Dhū Nuwās announced that he would persecute the Christians living in his kingdom because Christian states persecuted his fellow co-religionists in their realms; a letter survives written by Simon, the bishop of Beth Arsham in 524 CE, recounting Dimnon (who is probably Dhū Nuwās) persecution in Najran in Arabia.

Based on other contemporary sources, after seizing the throne of the Ḥimyarites in ca. 518 or 523 Dhū Nuwās attacked Najran and its inhabitants, capturing them and burning their churches. After accepting the city's capitulation, he massacred those inhabitants who would not renounce Christianity. According to the Arab historians, Dhū Nuwās then proceeded to write a letter to the Lakhmid king Al-Mundhir III ibn al-Nu'man of al-Ḥīrah and King Kavadh I of Persia, informing them of his deed and encouraging them to do likewise to the Christians under their dominion. Al-Mundhir received this letter in January 519, as he was receiving an embassy from Constantinople seeking to forge a peace between the Roman Empire and al-Ḥīrha. He revealed the contents of the letter to the Roman ambassadors who were horrified by its contents. Word of the slaughter quickly spread throughout the Roman and Persian realms, and refugees from Najran even reached the court of the Roman emperor Justin I himself, begging him to avenge the martyred Christians.

Sources and names
The name Yūsuf 'As'ar Yath'ar (believed to be Joseph Dhū-Nuwas) appears in an old South Arabian inscription. Related inscriptions from the same period were also deciphered by Jamme and Ryckmans, showing that in the ensuing wars with his non-Jewish subjects, the combined war booty (excluding deaths) from campaigns waged against the Abyssinians in Ẓafār, the fighters in ’Ašʻarān, Rakbān, Farasān, Muḥwān (Mocha), and the fighters and military units in Najran, amounted to 12,500 war trophies, 11,000 captives and 290,000 camels and bovines and sheep. 

According to ‘Irfan Shahid's Martyrs of Najran – New Documents, Dhu-Nuwas sent an army of some 120,000 soldiers to lay siege to the city of Najran, which siege lasted for six months, and the city taken and burnt on the 15th day of the seventh month (i.e. the lunar month Tishri). The city had revolted against the king and they refused to deliver it up unto the king. About three hundred of the city’s inhabitants surrendered to the king’s forces, under the assurances of an oath that no harm would come to them, and these were later bound, while those remaining in the city were burnt alive within their church. The death toll in this account is said to have reached about two thousand. However, in the Sabaean inscriptions describing these events, it is reported that by the month Dhu-Madra'an (between July and September) there were "1000 killed, 1500 prisoners [taken] and 10,000 head of cattle."

Jacques Ryckmans, who deciphered the Sabaean inscriptions, writes in his La Persécution des Chrétiens Himyarites, that Sarah'il Yaqbul-Yaz'an was both the tribal chief and the lieutenant of Yusuf 'As'ar (the king) at the time of the military campaign, and that he was sent out by the king to take the city of Najran, while the king watched for a possible Abyssinian/Ethiopian incursion along the coastal plains of Yemen near Mokhā (al-Moḫâ) and the strait known as Bāb al-Mandab. It is to be noted that the Ethiopian church in Ẓafar, which had been built by the Himyarite King some years earlier following the proselytizing mission of Theophilos the Indian and another church built by him in Aden (see: Ecclesiastical History of Philostorgius, Epitome of Book III, chapter 4), had been seen by Constantius II during the embassage to the land of the Ḥimyarites (i.e. Yemen) in circa 340 CE. This church was set on fire and razed to the ground, and its Abyssinian inhabitants killed. Later, foreigners (presumably Christians) living in Haḏramawt were also put to death before the king’s army advanced to Najran in the far north and took it.

King Yusuf Asar Yathar, described in an inscription as "king of all nations," had led the major tribes of Yemen (Hamedan, Madh'hij, Kinda, Murad) and successfully defeated the Abyssinian forces in Ẓafâr, Mokhā and Najran. Dhi Yazan leader, Samu Yafa' (سميفع أشوع), become the successor of Yusuf in 527 and the Abyssinian forces led by Abraha had invaded Yemen again in 531. 

Najran inscription (518 CE):Jawad al-Ali Sabians p41 

The first line :
Sabaean: ليبركن الن ذ لهو سمين وارضين ملكن يوسف اسار يثار ملك كل اشعبن وليبركن اقولن 
Arabic: 
God who owns the heavens and the earth bless king Yusuf Asar Yathar, king of all nations and bless the Aqials
Third line:
Sabaean: خصرو مراهمو ملكن يوسف اسار يثار كدهر قلسن وهرج احبشن بظفر وعلي حرب اشعرن وركبن وفرسنArabic: 
Who they stand with their master, King Yusuf Asar Yathar, when he burned the church and killed the Habashah (Abyssinians) in Dhofar and war on (Habashah) in Ash'aran and Rakban (regions) and Farasan 
Fifth line:
Sabaean: وكذه فلح لهفان ملكن بهيت سباتن خمس ماتو عثني عشر االفم مهرجتم واحد عشر االفم سبيم وتسعيArabic: 
The king has succeeded in these battles in the killing of 12,500 and capturing 11,090
Sixth line:
Sabaean: وثتي ماتن االفن ابلم وبقرم وضانم وتسطرو ذن مسندن قيل شرحال ذي يزن اقرن بعلي نجرنArabic: 
Booty of two hundred thousand camels, cows, sheep, and this Misnad (inscription) was written by Shrahal Dhi Yazan when camped in Najran

Seventh line:
Sabaean: بشعب ذ همدن هجرن وعربن ونقرم بن ازانن واعرب كدت ومردم ومذحجم واقولن اخوتهو بعم ملكن قرنمArabic: 
With the nation of Hamedan and the Arabs and the Yazaniin fighters and the A'rab ('nomads') of Kinda and Murad and Madh'hij and his brothers the Aqials who camped with the king

Eighth and ninth lines:
Sabaean: ببحرن بن حبشت ويصنعنن سسلت مدبن وككل ذذكرو بذل مسندن مهرجتم وغنمم ومقرنتم فكسباتمArabic: 
On the sea from the side of Habashah (Abyssinia) And they set up a series of fortifications in the Bab al-Mandab and all who mentioned in this Musnad they fought and took booty and camped in this mission
Sabaean: اوده ذ قفلو ابتهمو بثلثت عشر اورخم وليبركن رحمنن بنيهمو شرحبال يكمل وهعن اسار بني لحيعت'
Arabic: 
And they returned in the history of thirteen and Rahman (god) bless Sharhabal Ekml and Wh'an and Asar Bni Lhi't

References

External links
Dhu Nuwas, Zur'ah Yusuf ibn Tuban As'ad abi Karib - 1906 Jewish Encyclopedia article.
Jewish Warriors

Yemenite Jews
Jewish royalty
Kings of Himyar
History of Saudi Arabia
Converts to Judaism from paganism
Ancient Jewish history
Jewish monarchs
6th-century monarchs in the Middle East
6th-century Jews
6th-century Arabs
Persecution by Jews